Ride the Sky was a progressive power metal band formed by ex-Helloween, Gamma Ray, and Masterplan drummer Uli Kusch, and Tears of Anger members Bjørn Jansson and Benny Jansson.

History
The ground work for Ride the Sky began in 2006 when drummer Uli Kusch started swapping musical ideas with vocalist Bjorn Jansson. Uli left Masterplan later that year and was asked by Bjorn and Benny to do some guest work on the next Tears of Anger album. Uli was impressed with the music sent to him, and started sending some of his own compositions back to them. The three musicians decided to put all their work to play in Ride the Sky. The trio hired bassist Mathias Garnås, and keyboardist Kaspar Dahlqvist, in order to, according to them, to "Gain the highest caliber of talent to complete the band". They have so far released one album entitled New Protection, on metal label Nuclear Blast records. The band combines strong traits of progressive metal, power metal, and symphonic metal, with strong influences from 80s hard rock.

On November 17, 2007, on their website they announced that Kaspar departed from the line-up due to personal reasons, and that Ram-Zet's Henning "Zet" Ramseth was to replace him on keyboards and rhythm guitar for the rest of the tour.

On April 22, 2008 the band stated in their blog on MySpace that they have officially broken up, saying "There was not much media focus and together with a minor support from the record company, we came to the point where it was just not worth the work to even try to complete a second album."

Members

Final members
Bjørn Jansson – vocals
Uli Kusch – drums
Benny Jansson – guitar, backing vocals
Mathias Garnås – bass guitar

Former members
Kaspar Dahlqvist – keyboards

Session members
Henning Ramseth – keyboards, rhythm guitar

Discography
The band's only album, New Protection, was released through Nuclear Blast on August 22, 2007. It was recorded at Zinkens-Studios in Stockholm. A video was made for the title track of the album. AllMusic said the combination of metal and hard rock made New Protection a polished and effective album.

Track listing

The limited edition digipak and US track list contains "Make the Spirit Burn".
Some Japanese versions contain both bonus tracks with "Make the Spirit Burn" as #13 and "Trial of Flame" as #14.

Credits
 Bjørn Jansson − vocals
 Uli Kusch − drums
 Benny Jansson − guitar, backing vocals
 Kaspar Dahlqvist − keyboards
 Mathias Garnås − bass guitar

References

External links
 Official website
 Official MySpace

Swedish power metal musical groups
Swedish progressive metal musical groups
Swedish symphonic metal musical groups
Musical groups established in 2006
Musical groups disestablished in 2008
Heavy metal supergroups
Nuclear Blast artists